Joëlle Cartaux is a former French figure skater who competed in ladies singles. She is the 1969-71 French champion.

Results

References
 skatabase

Navigation

French female single skaters
Living people
Year of birth missing (living people)
Place of birth missing (living people)